Kazimierz Krzyżański (born March 3, 1960) is a Polish sprint canoer who competed in the late 1980s. He won two medals at the ICF Canoe Sprint World Championships with a silver (K-4 500 m: 1987) and a bronze (K-4 1000 m: 1986).

Krzyżański also finished fifth in the K-4 1000 m event at the 1988 Summer Olympics in Seoul.

References

Sports-reference.com profile

1960 births
Canoeists at the 1988 Summer Olympics
Living people
Olympic canoeists of Poland
Polish male canoeists
People from Police County
ICF Canoe Sprint World Championships medalists in kayak
Sportspeople from West Pomeranian Voivodeship